CIVICUS is an international non-profit organisation, which describes itself as “a global alliance dedicated to strengthening citizen action and civil society around the world." Founded in 1993, the organisation today counts more than 8500 members in more than 175 countries, with its headquarters in Johannesburg and offices in Geneva and New York.

Brief history
In 1991, an international group of 20 leaders from Non-Governmental Organisations (NGOs) and social movements met to explore how to support citizen participation in governmental decision-making processes. This process culminated in 1993 when a founding board established CIVICUS from the Latin term meaning "of the community".

Mission and values
The organisation works to protect and grow civic space where people can express and organise themselves. In particular, the organisation focuses on regions where participatory democracy and freedom of association are at risk. CIVICUS counts among its central values: Justice and Equality, where all people are free to exercise their rights as citizens as defined in the Universal Declaration of Human Rights.

Civil society/third sector of society 
Described as ‘the third sector’ of society, civil society is the main focus and target of CIVICUS. Its main projects and programmes are aimed at strengthening and serving civil society especially in the Global South. On its website, CIVICUS describes civil society as broad and that it “covers non-governmental organisations, activists, civil society coalitions and networks, protest and social movements, voluntary bodies, campaigning organisations, charities, faith-based groups, trade unions and philanthropic foundations.” These groups, individuals and organisations make up the CIVICUS membership.

Campaigns 
In an open letter of 25 July 2022 addressed to the UN Secretary-General António Guterres, CIVICUS sought the UN chief's intervention to protect human rights in Nicaragua. The letter raised concerns over the continuous attacks on civil society organisations by the President Daniel Ortega's regime and his Frente Sandinista de Liberación Nacional (FSLN) party. CIVICUS also urged its members to sign the letter which was available online.

Activities
In service of its mission and values, the organisation's primary areas of activity are: 
 The State of Civil Society Report assesses the operating environments for NGOs, global governance and legislative trends affecting civil liberties.
International Civil Society Week is a semi-annual global gathering for civil society to connect, debate and create shared solutions. Participation rates range from 500 to 1,000 delegates.
Goalkeepers Youth Action Accelerator: campaign dedicated to accelerating progress towards the U.N. Sustainable Development Goals.
Affinity Group for National Associations (AGNA): a network that brings together national associations and regional platforms.
CIVICUS Youth: connects young activists and encourages youth capacity.
Innovation 4 Change: a global network of people and organisations working together to protect civic space.
Resilient Roots: The Resilient Roots initiative tests whether organisations who are more accountable and responsive to their primary constituents are more resilient against external threats.
Diversity & Inclusion Group for Networking and Action (DIGNA): a group that brings together change-makers and thought leaders interested in the inclusivity and diversity of civil society.
CIVICUS Monitor: is a global research tool created and run by over 20 research partners. It tracks changes in civil society across the world and rates the state of civil society freedoms.
SPEAK! : provides a platform for people across the world to speak out on the issues that matter most to them.

Structure and Governance 
CIVICUS has approximately 70 members of staff and is led by Lysa John who replaces Dr Dhananjayan Sriskandarajah, who led the organisation from January 2013 to December 2018. Previous Secretary Generals of the organisation also include Miklos Marschall (Hungary), Kumi Naidoo (South Africa) and Ingrid Srinath (India)

The governing body of CIVICUS is an International Board of 13 civil society leaders from 13 countries.

Funding
Revenue to support the operations of CIVICUS is derived from multiple sources, including institutional funders, individual contributions, membership fees, and registration fees for the CIVICUS World Assembly. Aggregated income from 2017/2018 was roughly US$9.6 million.

In 2017/2018,CIVICUS received funding for its projects and core support, from the Dutch Ministry of Foreign Affairs, the Swedish International Development Cooperation Agency, Ford Foundation and the European Commission.

Milestones
Since its establishment in 1993, CIVICUS has built successively on its core programmatic activities.

 1994: Production of first regional reports on the state of civil society.
 1995: First World Assembly in Mexico City. The organisation has later gone on to hold 10 World Assemblies which have brought together thousands of activists to discuss and take action on the most pressing issues affecting civil society.
 2000: Kumi Naidoo joins CIVICUS as secretary general.
 2001-2002: Pilot phase of the Civil Society Index (CSI) analyses the state of civil society across a wide range of countries. Since its inception this research project has engaged thousands of stakeholders to exchange information across a total of 75 countries.
 2003: Headquarters move from Washington D.C. to Johannesburg, South Africa
 2004: Launch of the Global Call to Action Against Poverty (GCAP) with CIVICUS as a key partner.
 2005: Organises first Nelson Mandela- Graça Machel Innovation Awards to recognize leading achievements of grassroots organisations.
 2011: Produces first annual State of Civil Society Report which provides an assessment of the operating environments for NGOs, global governance and legislative trends affecting civil liberties.
 2013/ 2014: Start of International Civil Society Week in Johannesburg under the theme “Citizen action. People power”
 2016: ICSW in Bogota, Colombia “Active citizens, Accountable Actions”
 2017: CIVICUS Monitor begins rating the state of civic freedoms in 196 countries
 2019: ICSW  in Belgrade, Serbia: “Power of Togetherness”

References

International non-profit organizations
Civil society
Civic and political organisations based in Johannesburg
Non-profit organisations based in South Africa